The Battery "F" 1st Michigan Light Artillery Regiment was an artillery battery that served in the Union Army during the American Civil War.

Service
Battery "F"  was organized at Detroit and Coldwater, Michigan and mustered into service on  January 9, 1862.

The battery was mustered out on July 1, 1865.

Total strength and casualties
Over its existence, the battery carried a total of 246 men on its muster rolls.

The battery lost 1 officer and 9 enlisted men killed in action or mortally wounded and 23 enlisted men who died of disease, for a total of 33
fatalities.

Commanders
Captain John S. Andrews
Captain Byron D. Paddock

See also
List of Michigan Civil War Units
Michigan in the American Civil War

Notes

References
The Civil War Archive

Artillery
1865 disestablishments in Michigan
Artillery units and formations of the American Civil War
1862 establishments in Michigan
Military units and formations established in 1862
Military units and formations disestablished in 1865